Your Good Girl's Gonna Go Bad is a studio album by American country artist Tammy Wynette. It was released in May 1967 and contained ten tracks. The majority of the album was a collection of cover tunes Wynette recorded, including songs by George Jones, Loretta Lynn and Jeannie Seely. Several new songs were also part of the project. It was the debut studio album of Wynette's career and included two singles: "Apartment No. 9" and "Your Good Girl's Gonna Go Bad". The latter became Wynette's first chart success, climbing into the top five of the American country chart. The album itself reached the American country LP's chart in 1967. The album later received a positive review from AllMusic, which gave it a five-star rating.

Background, recording and content
In 1965, Tammy Wynette moved to Nashville, Tennessee with her three children in hopes of finding a recording contract. Second husband, Don Chapel, had attempted to secure his wife a recording contract but was turned down by the Decca, Hickory, Kapp and Musicor labels. As a last resort, a friend helped her schedule a meeting with a new producer named Billy Sherrill. Impressed by her talents, he signed her to Epic Records in 1966. With Sherrill serving as her producer, the pair began recording what came to be her debut studio album, which would later be titled Your Good Girl's Gonna Go Bad. The sessions began on September 1966 and were recorded at the Columbia Studio located in Nashville. The remainder of the album's sessions were complete in January 1967. 

The album contained a total of ten tracks. Six of the album's songs were previously-released singles by other country artists that Wynette covered: David Houston's "Almost Persuaded", Loretta Lynn's "Don't Come Home A-Drinkin' (With Lovin' on Your Mind)", Jeannie Seely's "Don't Touch Me", George Jones's "Walk Through This World with Me", Jack Greene's "There Goes My Everything" and Bobby Austin's "Apartment No. 9". Remaining tracks were original cuts, such as "Send Me No Roses", "I'm Not Mine to Give" and the Sherrill-Glenn Sutton-penned title track.

Release, reception and singles

Your Good Girl's Gonna Go Bad was originally released by Epic Records in May 1967. It marked the debut studio album of Wynette's recording career. Epic distributed the album as a vinyl LP, containing five songs on each side. In 1995, it was re-released as a compact disc via Legacy Recordings and digitally years later. In its initial release, the album reached number seven on the American Billboard Country LP's chart. It was the first charting album in Wynette's career. The album was later reviewed by Stephen Cook of AllMusic who gave it a five-star rating. Cook noted that the album was "one of her best" and concluded that it was "one of the classic debuts in country music".

The project contained two singles. Its first single was Wynette's cover of "Apartment No. 9", which was issued by Epic in October 1966. With the release, "Apartment No. 9" became Wynette's debut and first charting single in her career. On the American Billboard Hot Country Songs chart, it climbed to the number 44 position. The second single included on the album was the title track, which Epic issued in February 1967. It became the breakout single in Wynette's career, reaching number three on the Billboard country songs chart in June 1967.

Track listings

Vinyl version

Compact disc and digital versions

Chart performance

Release history

References

Footnotes

Books

1967 debut albums
Albums produced by Billy Sherrill
Epic Records albums
Tammy Wynette albums